Mosby's Dictionary of Medicine, Nursing & Health Professions is a dictionary of health related topics. The 8th edition, published in 2009, contains 2,240 pages and 2,400 colour illustrations. It includes some encyclopaedic definitions and 12 appendixes containing reference information. Earlier versions are titled Mosby's Medical, Nursing & Allied Health Dictionary.

References

Medical dictionaries